The 1972 Ball State Cardinals football team was an American football team that represented Ball State University as an independent during the 1972 NCAA University Division football season. In its second season under head coach Dave McClain, the team compiled a 5–4–1 record. The team played its home games at Ball State Stadium in Muncie, Indiana.

Schedule

References

Ball State
Ball State Cardinals football seasons
Ball State Cardinals football